Alfred Joel Horford Reynoso (born June 3, 1986) is a Dominican professional basketball player for the Boston Celtics of the National Basketball Association (NBA). Nicknamed "Big Al", Horford is a five-time NBA All-Star and is the highest paid Latin American basketball player.

He played college basketball for the Florida Gators and was the starting center on their back-to-back National Collegiate Athletic Association (NCAA) national championships teams in 2006 and 2007. He was drafted with the third overall pick in the 2007 NBA draft by the Atlanta Hawks, a team he played nine seasons with before signing with the Celtics as a free agent in the 2016 off-season. After playing three seasons with the Celtics, he signed with the 76ers in the 2019 off-season and played a season with the team before being traded in the 2020 off-season to the Thunder. Prior to the 2021 season, Horford was traded to the Celtics, with whom he reached the NBA finals.

Early years and high school career
Horford was born in Puerto Plata, Dominican Republic. His father, Tito Horford, played in the National Basketball Association (NBA) for three years and several more in other countries. In 2000, Horford and his family moved to Lansing, Michigan, where he attended Grand Ledge High School in Grand Ledge, Michigan, and was a star on its basketball team. Horford holds seven school records, including most career points (1,239). As a senior, he was named "Class A Player of the Year" after averaging 21 points, 13 rebounds and five blocks per game. While at Grand Ledge, Horford played AAU basketball for the Michigan Mustangs, who were runners-up in the Adidas Big Time National Tournament. Considered a four-star recruit by Rivals.com, Horford was listed as the No. 7 power forward and the No. 36 player in the nation in 2004.

College career
Horford accepted an athletic scholarship to attend the University of Florida, choosing the Gators over Michigan, Michigan State, and Ohio State. There he played for coach Billy Donovan and teamed up alongside Joakim Noah, Corey Brewer and Taurean Green. He made an immediate impact for the Gators in 2004–05, starting at center in the front court with David Lee, and helped the Gators win the 2005 Southeastern Conference tournament championship.

The Gators surged through the 2005–06 season, winning the SEC championship for a second straight year. They entered the 2006 NCAA tournament as the No. 3 seed. The Gators swept through the first four rounds to reach the Final Four. There they defeated George Mason to reach the final. In the final, they defeated UCLA for the 2006 championship behind Horford's 14 points and seven rebounds.

In December 2006, midway through his junior year, Horford missed a series of games due to injury. Coach Donovan held him out of a game against Stetson in hopes that he would be adequately healed for a game in Gainesville against the third-ranked Ohio State Buckeyes on December 23. One day before the game, Donovan announced that Horford would be unable to play, but Horford entered the game from the bench to guard Ohio State player Greg Oden, a highly-touted 7'0" freshman. Oden scored just seven points, well below his season average of 15. Horford scored 11 points and added 11 rebounds in limited action, as the Gators defeated the Buckeyes. In the final home game of the season, on March 4, 2007, against Kentucky, Horford became the fourth player on his team to score 1,000 career points. He required 14 points during the game to reach the milestone, and scored exactly 14.

On April 2, 2007, the Gators became the first team to repeat as national champions since the 1991–92 Duke Blue Devils, and the first ever to do so with the same starting lineup. They defeated Oden and Ohio State in a rematch from the regular season, 84-75. Three days later, Horford, Joakim Noah, Corey Brewer and Taurean Green all declared for the NBA draft.

Professional basketball career

Atlanta Hawks (2007–2016)

All-Rookie honors (2007–2008)
On June 28, 2007, Horford was selected by the Atlanta Hawks with the third overall pick in the 2007 NBA draft. On July 9, he signed his rookie scale contract with the Hawks. As a rookie in 2007–08, Horford was the only player unanimously selected to the NBA All-Rookie First Team; he was also runner-up for Rookie of the Year honors and was named Rookie of the Month on four occasions. He became the first Atlanta draftee to earn first team honors since Stacey Augmon in 1991–92. Horford averaged 10.1 points, 9.7 rebounds, 1.5 assists, 0.9 blocks, 0.7 steals and 31.4 minutes in 81 games (77 starts). The Hawks finished the regular season with a 37–45 record and entered the playoffs as the eighth seed in the Eastern Conference. In their first round match-up with the Boston Celtics, Horford helped the Hawks take the eventual champions to seven games, losing the series 4–3. In the series, Horford averaged 12.6 points and 10.4 rebounds per game.

Back-to-back All-Star selections (2008–2011)

In 2008–09, Horford started all 67 games he played in, averaging 11.5 points, 9.3 rebounds, 2.4 assists, 1.4 blocks and 0.8 steals in 33.5 minutes. With a 47–35 record, the Hawks entered the playoffs as the fourth seed in the East. Horford helped the Hawks advance to the second round where they were swept by the Cleveland Cavaliers; Horford missed Game 2 of the series due to injury.

Horford had an outstanding season in 2009–10, becoming the first Hawks draft pick to earn an All-Star berth since Kevin Willis did so in 1992. Horford contributed 14.2 points, 9.9 rebounds, 2.3 assists, 1.1 blocks and 0.7 steals in 35.1 minutes (.551 FG%, .789 FT%), appearing in 81 games. He ranked eighth in the NBA in field goal percentage, 10th in rebounds, tied for ninth in offensive rebounds (2.9), and 26th in blocks. He had a team-leading 39 double-doubles, which was tied for 11th in the NBA. Playing alongside Mike Bibby, Jamal Crawford, Joe Johnson, Josh Smith and Marvin Williams, the Hawks entered the playoffs as the third seed in the East with a 53–29. However, the team failed to get past the second round for a second straight year, getting swept again, this time by the Orlando Magic.

On November 1, 2010, Horford signed a five-year, $60 million contract extension with the Hawks.

During the 2011 NBA All-Star Weekend, Horford was an All-Star for the second straight year, and he was also a member of the Atlanta team that won the Shooting Stars Competition. In 77 games in 2010–11, he posted averages of 15.3 points, 9.3 rebounds, 3.5 assists, 1.0 blocks and 0.8 steals (.557 FG%, .500 3FG%, .798 FT%). He ranked fifth in the NBA in field goal percentage, 28th in blocks and 16th in efficiency (22.5). He was also one of the top all-around rebounders in the league, finishing 11th in rebounds, seventh in defensive rebounds (7.0) and tied for 24th in offensive rebounds (2.4). He had 36 double-doubles (tied for ninth in NBA), including one 20/20 game. He was named Third-Team All-NBA. With a 44–38 record, the Hawks entered the playoffs as the fifth seed in the East. They made it through to the second round again, this time losing 4–2 to the Chicago Bulls.

Injury-shortened season (2011–2012)
Due to the 2011 NBA lockout, the 2011–12 season did not begin until December 25, 2011. Horford appeared in the Hawks' first 11 games of the season before missing the final 55 due to a torn left pectoral muscle, an injury suffered on January 11, 2012, against the Indiana Pacers. On January 17, he underwent surgery to repair the muscle and was ruled out for three-to-four months. With a 40–26 record, the Hawks entered the playoffs as the fifth seed in the East. Horford missed an additional three playoff games before returning to action in Game 4 of the Hawks' first round series against the Boston Celtics. He played out the series, a series the Hawks lost 4–2.

Career-best season (2012–2013)
In 2012–13, Horford started all 74 games he played in, averaging a career-high 17.4 points, career-high 10.2 rebounds, 3.2 assists, 1.1 blocks and career-high 1.1 steals in 37.2 minutes. He recorded 43 double-doubles (20 20-point/10-rebound games), including one in points and assists. He scored 20-plus points in nine consecutive games (February 11 – March 3) for the first time in his career. On November 26, 2012, he was named Eastern Conference Player of the Week for the first time in his career. On February 27, 2013, he scored a career-high 34 points in a 102–91 win over the Utah Jazz. With a 44–38 record, the Hawks entered the playoffs as the sixth seed in the East. In their first round match-up against the Indiana Pacers, the Hawks were defeated 4–2 despite a playoff career-high 16.7 points per game from Horford over the six games.

Another injury-shortened season (2013–2014)

Over the first 29 games of the 2013–14 season, Horford posted nine double-doubles and scored in double-figures 28 times, including 13 20-point outings and one 30-point game. Over this stretch, he averaged a career-best 18.6 points per game. However, another shoulder injury suffered on December 26, 2013, sidelined him for the rest of the season. Initially considered a "bruised right shoulder", the injury turned out to be a complete tear of his right pectoral muscle, and required season-ending surgery. He did not play in the postseason, where the Hawks lost in the first round to the Indiana Pacers.

Return to All-Star form (2014–2016)
In 2014–15, Horford played in 76 regular season games, the most since the 2010–11 season. On December 22, 2014, he was named Eastern Conference Player of the Week for games played Monday, December 15 through Sunday, December 21. He earned the award for just the second time in his career. On January 13, 2015, he recorded his first career triple-double with 21 points, 10 rebounds and 10 assists in a 105–87 win over the Philadelphia 76ers. Six days later, he was named Eastern Conference Player of the Week for games played Monday, January 12 through Sunday, January 18. On January 29, he earned his third All-Star nod as a reserve for the Eastern Conference in the 2015 NBA All-Star Game. In a brilliant stretch of play from December 7 to January 31, Horford scored in double digits in 28 consecutive games. Between December and January, the Hawks went 28–2 and had a franchise-best 19 game winning streak. Behind Horford and fellow All-Star teammates Paul Millsap, Kyle Korver and Jeff Teague, the Hawks finished the regular season with the best record in the East at 60–22, and advanced through to the Eastern Conference Finals for the first time since the 1960s, when the franchise was located in St. Louis. There they were defeated by the Cleveland Cavaliers in four games.

In 2015–16, Horford played in all 82 regular season games for the first time in his career. On November 11, 2015, he scored 26 points and made a career-high four three-pointers in a 106–98 win over the New Orleans Pelicans. On December 4, he scored 16 points against the Los Angeles Lakers to extend his streak of double-digit games to 22, setting a career high. His streak came to an end at 23 after scoring nine points against the Oklahoma City Thunder in the Hawks' 24th game of the season on December 10. On February 12, 2016, Horford was named to replace the injured Chris Bosh on the 2016 Eastern Conference All-Star team, thus marking his fourth All-Star selection. On February 28, he recorded his 200th career double-double with 13 points and 16 rebounds in an 87–76 win over the Charlotte Hornets. With a 48–34 record, the Hawks entered the playoffs as the fourth seed in the East. They advanced through to the second round where they were swept by the Cleveland Cavaliers for the second straight year.

Boston Celtics (2016–2019)
On July 1, 2016, Horford became an unrestricted free agent. The Hawks were optimistic they could reach a new deal with Horford, but after the team committed much of their salary cap to pick up Dwight Howard, it would have taken a max offer to land Horford. Horford signed a four-year, $113 million contract with the Boston Celtics on July 8, and said he was looking forward to working with Celtics head coach Brad Stevens and the rest of the team to bring a championship trophy back to Boston. He made his debut for the Celtics in their season opener on October 26, 2016, scoring 11 points in a 122–117 win over the Brooklyn Nets. He appeared in the team's first three games of the season, but then missed nine straight games with a concussion. He returned to action on November 19 and had 18 points and 11 rebounds in a 94–92 win over the Detroit Pistons. On March 19, 2017, he scored a season-high 27 points in a 105–99 loss to the Philadelphia 76ers. In Game 1 of the Celtics' second-round playoff series against the Washington Wizards, Horford nearly had a triple-double with 21 points, 10 rebounds and nine assists in a 123–111 win. The Celtics went on to reach the Eastern Conference Finals, where they were defeated 4–1 by the Cleveland Cavaliers.

On November 12, 2017, Horford returned from a two-game absence with a concussion and scored 21 points on 8-of-9 shooting to help the Celtics hang on to beat the Toronto Raptors 95–94 for their 12th straight victory. On December 2, he recorded 14 points and a career-best 11 assists in a 116–111 win over the Phoenix Suns. Two days later, he recorded 20 points, nine rebounds and eight assists in a 111–100 win over the Milwaukee Bucks. On February 4, 2018, he made a 15-foot fadeaway jumper at the buzzer to lift the Celtics to a 97–96 win over the Portland Trail Blazers, finishing with 22 points and 10 rebounds. In Game 1 of the Celtics' first-round playoff series against the Bucks, Horford had 24 points and 12 rebounds in a 113–107 overtime win. In Game 7, Horford had 26 points and eight rebounds in a 112–96 win over the Bucks. The Celtics went on to reach the Eastern Conference Finals, where they were defeated in seven games by the Cavaliers.

On October 19, 2018, Horford had 14 points, 10 rebounds and nine assists in a 113–101 loss to the Raptors. In December, he missed seven games with a sore left knee. On December 29, he scored 18 points with a career high-tying five 3-pointers in a 112–103 win over the Memphis Grizzlies. On February 21, 2019, he recorded 21 points and a season-high 17 rebounds in a 98–97 loss to the Bucks. On April 1, he recorded his second career triple-double with 19 points, 11 rebounds, and 10 assists in a 110–105 win over the Miami Heat.

Philadelphia 76ers (2019–2020)
On July 10, 2019, Horford signed with the Philadelphia 76ers. An unrestricted free agent, Horford signed a four-year, $97 million (with $12 million in bonuses) contract. On October 23, he made his 76ers debut, recording 16 points, two rebounds and three assists in a 107–93 win over the Boston Celtics. On November 4, Horford scored a season-high 32 points, alongside five rebounds, four assists and two steals, in a 114–109 loss to the Phoenix Suns. The 76ers faced the Celtics during their first-round playoff series, but they were eliminated in a four-game sweep, with Horford only averaging 7.0 points per game.

Oklahoma City Thunder (2020–2021)
On December 8, 2020, Horford was traded, alongside a 2025 first-round pick and the draft rights to Théo Maledon and Vasilije Micić, to the Oklahoma City Thunder in exchange for Terrance Ferguson, Danny Green and Vincent Poirier. Horford's arrival came three months after his former college coach, Billy Donovan, departed the Thunder. Horford made his Thunder debut on December 26, recording three points, a season-high 13 rebounds and three assists in a 109–107 win over the Charlotte Hornets. On February 5, 2021, he scored a season-high 26 points, alongside seven rebounds, eight assists, two steals and three blocks, in a 106–103 loss to the Minnesota Timberwolves. On March 27, the Thunder announced that Horford would sit out the rest of the season as the team prioritized developing its younger players.

Return to the Celtics (2021–present)
On June 18, 2021, Horford was traded, alongside Moses Brown and a 2023 second-round pick, to the Boston Celtics in exchange for Kemba Walker, the 16th overall pick in the 2021 NBA draft, and a 2025 second-round pick. On March 3, 2022, Horford helped the Celtics to a win over the Memphis Grizzlies, with a season-high 21 points and 15 rebounds.

On May 7, 2022, in Game 3 of the Eastern Conference Semifinals, Horford scored 22 points along with 16 rebounds, 5 assists, 2 blocks and zero turnovers in a 103–101 loss against the reigning champions Milwaukee Bucks. Two days later, Horford scored a playoff career-high 30 points along with 8 rebounds on 11-of-14 shooting from the field and also had a playoff career-high 5-of-7 shooting from three in a 116–108 Game 4 win to tie the series at 2–2.

On May 29, 2022, Horford reached the NBA Finals for the first time in his 15-year career when the Celtics defeated the Miami Heat in Game 7 of the Eastern Conference Finals, 100–96. Before doing so, he set a record for the most playoff games without a Finals appearance, with 141. He also became the first Dominican to reach the NBA Finals. In Game 1 of the Finals, Horford led the Celtics to a 120–108 win over the Golden State Warriors with 26 points and six rebounds. During the game, he hit six 3-pointers, setting an NBA record for most threes made by a player in his Finals debut. The Celtics took a 2–1 series lead, but eventually lost in 6 games despite Horford's 19-point, 14-rebound outing in the 103–90 close-out loss in Game 6.

On December 1, 2022, Horford signed a 2-year, $20 million extension with the Celtics.

National team career
Horford has been a member of the Dominican Republic national basketball team since 2008. In 2011, he won a bronze medal at the FIBA Americas Championship, and earned All-Tournament Team honors.

Career statistics

NBA

Regular season

|-
| style="text-align:left;"|
| style="text-align:left;"|Atlanta
| 81 || 77 || 31.4 || .499 || .000 || .731 || 9.7 || 1.5 || .7 || .9 || 10.1
|-
| style="text-align:left;"|
| style="text-align:left;"|Atlanta
| 67 || 67 || 33.5 || .525 || .000 || .727 || 9.3 || 2.4 || .8 || 1.4 || 11.5
|-
| style="text-align:left;"|
| style="text-align:left;"|Atlanta
| 81 || 81 || 35.1 || .551 || 1.000 || .789 || 9.9 || 2.3 || .7 || 1.1 || 14.2
|-
| style="text-align:left;"|
| style="text-align:left;"|Atlanta
| 77 || 77 || 35.1 || .557 || .500 || .798 || 9.3 || 3.5 || .8 || 1.0 || 15.3
|-
| style="text-align:left;"|
| style="text-align:left;"|Atlanta
| 11 || 11 || 31.6 || .553 || .000 || .733 || 7.0 || 2.2 || .9 || 1.3 || 12.4
|-
| style="text-align:left;"|
| style="text-align:left;"| Atlanta
| 74 || 74 || 37.2 || .543 || .500 || .644 || 10.2 || 3.2 ||  1.1 || 1.1 || 17.5
|-
| style="text-align:left;"|
| style="text-align:left;"|Atlanta
| 29 || 29 || 33.1 || .567 || .364 || .682 || 8.4 || 2.6 || .9 ||  1.5 || 18.6
|-
| style="text-align:left;"|
| style="text-align:left;"|Atlanta
| 76 || 76 || 30.5 || .538 || .306 || .759 || 7.2 || 3.2 || .9 || 1.3 || 15.2
|-
| style="text-align:left;"|
| style="text-align:left;"|Atlanta
| 82 || 82 || 32.1 || .505 || .344 || .798 || 7.3 || 3.2 || .8 || 1.5 || 15.2
|-
| style="text-align:left;"|
| style="text-align:left;"|Boston
| 68 || 68 || 32.3 || .473 || .355 || .800 || 6.8 || 5.0 || .8 || 1.3 || 14.0
|-
| style="text-align:left;"|
| style="text-align:left;"|Boston
| 72 || 72 || 31.6 || .489 || .429 || .783 || 7.4 || 4.7 || .6 || 1.1 || 12.9
|-
| style="text-align:left;"|
| style="text-align:left;"|Boston
| 68 || 68 || 29.0 || .535 || .360 || .821 || 6.7 || 4.2 || .9 || 1.3 || 13.6
|-
| style="text-align:left;"|
| style="text-align:left;"|Philadelphia
| 67 || 61 || 30.2 || .450 || .350 || .763 || 6.8 || 4.0 || .8 || .9 || 11.9
|-
| style="text-align:left;"|
| style="text-align:left;"|Oklahoma City
| 28 || 28 || 27.9 || .450 || .368 || .818 || 6.7 || 3.4 || .9 || .9 || 14.2
|-
| style="text-align:left;"|
| style="text-align:left;"|Boston
| 69 || 69 || 29.1 || .467 || .336 || .842 || 7.7 || 3.4 || .7 || 1.3 || 10.2
|- class="sortbottom"
| style="text-align:center;" colspan="2"|Career
| 950 || 940 || 32.2 || .515 || .360 || .759 || 8.2 || 3.3 || .8 || 1.2 || 13.7
|- class="sortbottom"
| style="text-align:center;" colspan="2"|All-Star
| 5 || 0 || 12.0 || .667 || .200 || 1.000 || 4.4 || 1.6 || .4 || .4 || 6.2

Playoffs

|-
| style="text-align:left;"|2008
| style="text-align:left;"|Atlanta
| 7 || 7 || 39.6 || .472 ||  || .741 || 10.4 || 3.6 || .4 || 1.0 || 12.6
|-
| style="text-align:left;"|2009
| style="text-align:left;"|Atlanta
| 9 || 9 || 28.0 || .424 || .000 || .667 || 5.8 || 2.0 || .7 || .7 || 6.9
|-
| style="text-align:left;"|2010
| style="text-align:left;"|Atlanta
| 11 || 11 || 35.3 || .523 || 1.000 || .839 || 9.0 || 1.8 || .7 || 1.7 || 14.6
|-
| style="text-align:left;"|2011
| style="text-align:left;"|Atlanta
| 12 || 12 || 39.0 || .423 || .000 || .769 || 9.6 || 3.5 || .4 || 1.0 || 11.3
|-
| style="text-align:left;"|2012
| style="text-align:left;"|Atlanta
| 3 || 2 || 36.0 || .588 ||  || .750 || 8.3 || 2.7 || 1.3 || 1.3 || 15.3
|-
| style="text-align:left;"|2013
| style="text-align:left;"|Atlanta
| 6 || 6 || 36.3 || .494 ||  || .667 || 8.8 || 3.0 || 1.0 || .8 || 16.7
|- 
| style="text-align:left;"|2015
| style="text-align:left;"|Atlanta
| 16 || 16 || 32.6 || .507 || .222 || .750 || 8.6 || 3.7 || .8 || 1.4 || 14.4     
|-
| style="text-align:left;"|2016
| style="text-align:left;"|Atlanta
| 10 || 10 || 32.7 || .466 || .393 || .938 || 6.5 || 3.0 || 1.2 || 2.4 || 13.4     
|-
| style="text-align:left;"|2017
| style="text-align:left;"|Boston
| 18 || 18 || 33.9 || .584 || .519 || .759 || 6.6 || 5.4 || .8 || .8 || 15.1     
|-
| style="text-align:left;"|2018
| style="text-align:left;"|Boston
| 19 || 19 || 35.7 || .544 || .349 || .827 || 8.3 || 3.3 || 1.0 || 1.2 || 15.7
|-
| style="text-align:left;"|2019
| style="text-align:left;"|Boston
| 9 || 9 || 34.4 || .418 || .409 || .833 || 9.0 || 4.4 || .4 || .8 || 13.9
|-
| style="text-align:left;"|2020
| style="text-align:left;"|Philadelphia
| 4 || 3 || 32.0 || .480 || .000 || .571 || 7.3 || 2.3 || .3 || 1.3 || 7.0
|-
| style="text-align:left;"|2022
| style="text-align:left;"|Boston
| 23 || 23 || 35.4 || .523 || .480 || .778 || 9.3 || 3.3 || .8 || 1.3 || 12.0
|- class="sortbottom"
| style="text-align:center;" colspan="2"|Career
| 147 || 145 || 34.7 || .504 || .429 || .778 || 8.3 || 3.4 || .8 || 1.2 || 13.3

College

|-
| style="text-align:left;"|2004–05
| style="text-align:left;"|Florida
| 32 || 25 || 22.8 || .480 ||  || .582 || 6.5 || .9 || .8 || 1.6 || 5.6
|-
| style="text-align:left;"|2005–06
| style="text-align:left;"|Florida
| 39 || 39 || 25.9 || .608 || .000 || .611 || 7.6 || 2.0 || 1.0 || 1.7 || 11.3
|-
| style="text-align:left;"|2006–07
| style="text-align:left;"|Florida
| 38 || 36 || 27.8 || .608 || .000 || .644 || 9.5 || 2.2 || .7 || 1.8 || 13.2
|- class="sortbottom"
| style="text-align:center;" colspan="2" |Career
| 109 || 100 || 25.7 || .586 || .000 || .619 || 7.9 || 1.7 || .9 || 1.7 || 10.3

Personal life
Horford's father, Tito Horford, also played basketball. Tito, whose father was a Bahamian immigrant, was recruited by Marian Christian High School in Houston and attended Louisiana State and Miami before being drafted in the second round of the 1988 NBA draft. He played three years in the NBA and several more overseas. His uncle, Kelly Horford, played at Florida Atlantic University in the early 1990s, while his brother, Jon Horford, played at Michigan and Florida. He also has two sisters and three younger brothers.

Horford married 2003 Miss Universe Amelia Vega in Santo Domingo on December 24, 2011.  Horford and Vega have five children together.  Horford is a member of the Church of God Ministry of Jesus Christ International.

See also

 List of second-generation National Basketball Association players
 Dominican-Americans in Boston

References

External links

 Florida Gators bio
 

1986 births
Living people
Afro-Dominican (Dominican Republic)
All-American college men's basketball players
Atlanta Hawks draft picks
Atlanta Hawks players
Boston Celtics players
Centers (basketball)
Dominican Republic men's basketball players
Dominican Republic people of Bahamian descent
Florida Gators men's basketball players
Members of the Church of God Ministry of Jesus Christ International
National Basketball Association All-Stars
National Basketball Association players from the Dominican Republic
Oklahoma City Thunder players
People from Grand Ledge, Michigan
People from Puerto Plata, Dominican Republic
Philadelphia 76ers players
Power forwards (basketball)
Sportspeople from Lansing, Michigan